Amon Düül (UK) was the British splinter of the German krautrock band Amon Düül II that was active during the 1980s. The band released four original studio albums during their career, and one compilation. The band was initially named Amon Düül II, then Amon Düül – the (UK) designation was later added by fans to differentiate this lineup from the earlier one.

The band was formed in 1981 by guitarist John Weinzerl and bassist Dave Anderson in Wales, both of whom had been members of Amon Düül II, and featured drummer Guy Evans from the British progressive rock band Van der Graaf Generator, with Julie Wareing on vocals.

Four Amon Düül (UK) releases have been remastered and reissued as of August 2008.

Discography 

Studio albums
Hawk Meets Penguin (as Amon Duul II, 1982)
Meetings With Menmachines – Inglorious Heroes of the Past... (as Amon Düül II, 1983)
Die Lösung (with Robert Calvert, as Amon Düül) (1989)
Fool Moon (as Amon Düül, 1989)

Compilation
Airs on a Shoe String (as Amon Duul, 1987, compilation)

References

External links 
Amon Düül UK in the Gibraltar Encyclopedia of Progressive Rock.
Amon Düül UK at Prog Archives.

Krautrock musical groups
Musical groups established in 1981
Musical groups disestablished in 1989
1981 establishments in the United Kingdom
1989 disestablishments in the United Kingdom